The 79th Infantry Division (formerly known as the 79th Division) was an infantry formation of the United States Army Reserve in World Wars I and II.

Since 2009, it has been active as the 79th Theater Sustainment Command.

World War I
Activated: August 1917
Overseas: July 1918
Major operations: Meuse-Argonne
Casualties: Total-6,874 (KIA-1,151 ; WIA-5,723)
Commanders: Maj. Gen. Joseph E. Kuhn (25 August 1917), Brig. Gen. William Jones Nicholson (26 November 1917), Maj. Gen. Joseph E. Kuhn (17 February 1918), Maj. Gen. Joseph E. Kuhn (16 April 1918), Brig. Gen. W. J. Nicholson (22 May 1918), Maj. Gen. Joseph E. Kuhn (8 June 1918), Brig. Gen. W. J. Nicholson (28 June 1918), Maj. Gen. Joseph E. Kuhn (23 July 1918), Brig. Gen. Evan M. Johnson (29 December 1918), Maj. Gen. Joseph E. Kuhn (31 December 1918), Brig. Gen. Evan M. Johnson (19 January 1919), Brig. Gen. John S. Winn (2 February 1919), Brig. Gen. Andrew Hero Jr. (3 February 1919), Brig. Gen. Evan M. Johnson (9 February 1919), Maj. Gen. Joseph E. Kuhn (28 February 1919), brig. Gen. Evan M. Johnson (16 March 1919), Maj. Gen. Joseph E. Kuhn (30 March 1919), Brig. Gen. Joseph S. Winn (4 May 1919), Maj. Gen. Joseph E. Kuhn (8 May 1919).
Returned to U.S.: May 1919
Inactivated: June 1919

Order of battle

 Headquarters, 79th Division
 157th Infantry Brigade
 313th Infantry Regiment
 314th Infantry Regiment
 311th Machine Gun Battalion
 158th Infantry Brigade
 315th Infantry Regiment
 316th Infantry Regiment 
 312th Machine Gun Battalion
 154th Field Artillery Brigade
 310th Field Artillery Regiment (75 mm)
 311th Field Artillery Regiment (75 mm)
 312th Field Artillery Regiment (155 mm)
 304th Trench Mortar Battery
 310th Machine Gun Battalion
 304th Engineer Regiment
 304th Field Signal Battalion
 Headquarters Troop, 79th Division
 304th Train Headquarters and Military Police
 304th Ammunition Train
 304th Supply Train
 304th Engineer Train
 304th Sanitary Train
 313th, 314th, 315th, and 316th Ambulance Companies and Field Hospitals

Combat chronicle
The division was first activated at Camp Meade, Maryland in August 1917, composed primarily of draftees from Maryland and Pennsylvania. After a year of training the division sailed overseas in July 1918. The 79th Division saw extensive combat in the Meuse-Argonne Offensive area where it earned the name of "Cross of Lorraine" for their defense of France. The division was inactivated June 1919 and returned to the United States.

Throughout its entire World War I campaign, the division suffered 6,874 casualties with 1,151 killed and 5,723 wounded. Private Henry Gunther, the last American soldier to be killed in action during World War I, served with the 313th Infantry Regiment of the 79th Division.

Interwar period
The division was reconstituted in the Organized Reserve on 24 June 1921 and assigned to the eastern half of the state of Pennsylvania. The headquarters was organized on 29 September 1921. It formed part of the XIII Corps (United States), Third Corps Area.

World War II
Ordered into active military service: 15 June 1942 at Camp Pickett, Virginia
Trained at Camp Laguna in California in 1943.
Overseas: 7 April 1944
Campaigns: Normandy, Northern France, Rhineland, Ardennes-Alsace, Central Europe
Days of combat: 248
Distinguished Unit Citations: 8
Awards: Medal of Honor-3 ; Distinguished Service Cross (United States)-13 ; Distinguished Service Medal (United States)-1 ; Silver Star-962; Legion of Merit-11 ; Soldier's Medal-27 ; Bronze Star-4,916 ; Air Medal-78
Commanders: Major General Ira T. Wyche (June 1942 – May 1945), Brigadier General Leroy H. Watson (May–July 1945), Major General Anthony C. McAuliffe (July–August 1945), Brigadier General Leroy H. Watson (August 1945 to inactivation).
Returned to U.S.: 10 December 1945.
Inactivated: 20 December 1945, Camp Kilmer, New Jersey.
Reactivated: (Organized Reserve division 29 November 1946).

Order of battle

 Headquarters, 79th Infantry Division
 313th Infantry Regiment
 314th Infantry Regiment
 315th Infantry Regiment
 Headquarters and Headquarters Battery, 79th Infantry Division Artillery
310th Field Artillery Battalion (105 mm)
311th Field Artillery Battalion (105 mm)
312th Field Artillery Battalion (155 mm)
904th Field Artillery Battalion (105 mm)
 304th Engineer Combat Battalion
 304th Medical Battalion
 79th Cavalry Reconnaissance Troop (Mechanized)
 Headquarters, Special Troops, 79th Infantry Division
 Headquarters Company, 79th Infantry Division
 779th Ordnance Light Maintenance Company
 79th Quartermaster Company
 79th Signal Company
 Military Police Platoon
 Band
 79th Counterintelligence Corps Detachment

Combat chronicle
The division was activated at Camp Pickett, Virginia on 15 June 1942. It participated in the Tennessee Maneuver Area, after which it moved to Camp Laguna near Yuma, Arizona, where it trained in the desert. It was then ordered to Camp Phillips, Kansas for training in winter conditions. At the beginning of April 1944, the division reported to the port of embarkation at Camp Myles Standish, Massachusetts.

The division arrived in Liverpool on 17 April and began training in amphibious operations. After training in the United Kingdom from 17 April 1944, the 79th Infantry Division landed on Utah Beach, Normandy, 12–14 June and entered combat 19 June 1944, with an attack on the high ground west and northwest of Valognes and high ground south of Cherbourg Naval Base. The division took Fort du Roule after a heavy engagement and entered Cherbourg, 25 June. It was around this time that Corporal John D. Kelly and First Lieutenant Carlos C. Ogden, both of the 314th Infantry Regiment, were awarded the Medal of Honor. It held a defensive line at the Ollonde River until 2 July 1944 and then returned to the offensive, taking La Haye du Puits in house-to-house fighting, 8 July. On 26 July, the 79th attacked across the Ay River, took Lessay, crossed the Sarthe River and entered Le Mans, 8 August, meeting only light resistance. The advance continued across the Seine, 19 August. Heavy German counterattacks were repelled, 22–27 August, and the division reached the Therain River, 31 August. Moving swiftly to the Franco-Belgian frontier near St. Amand (east of Lille), the division was then moved to XV Corps in eastern France, where it encountered heavy resistance in taking Charmes in street fighting, 12 September. The 79th cut across the Moselle and Meurthe Rivers, 13–23 September, cleared the Forêt de Parroy in a severe engagement, 28 September – 9 October, and attacked to gain high ground east of Emberménil, 14–23 October, when it was relieved, 24 October.

After rest and training at Lunéville, the division returned to combat with an attack from the MignevineMontiguy area, 13 November 1944, which carried it across the Vezouse and Moder Rivers, 18 November – 10 December, through Haguenau in spite of determined enemy resistance, and into the Siegfried Line, 17–20 December. The division held a defensive line along the Lauter River, at Wissembourg from 20 December 1944 until 2 January 1945, when it withdrew to Maginot Line defenses. The German attempt to establish a bridgehead west of the Rhine at Gambsheim resulted in furious fighting. The 79th beat off German attacks at Hatten and Rittershoffen in an 11-day battle before withdrawing to new defensive positions south of Haguenau on the Moder River, 19 January 1945. The division remained on the defensive along the Moder until 6 February 1945. During February and March 1945, the division mopped up German resistance, returned to offensive combat, 24 March 1945, crossed the Rhine, drove across the Rhine-Herne Canal, 7 April, secured the north bank of the Ruhr and took part in clearing the Ruhr Pocket until 13 April. The division then went on occupation duty, in the Dortmund, Sudetenland, and Bavarian areas successively, until its return to the United States and inactivation.

CasualtiesTotal battle casualties: 15,203Killed in action: 2,476Wounded in action: 10,971Missing in action: 579Prisoner of war: 1,186

Assignments in European Theater of Operations
18 April 1944: VIII Corps, Third Army.
29 May 1944: Third Army but attached to VII Corps, First Army.
30 June 1944: Third Army, but attached to First Army.
1 July 1944: VIII Corps.
1 August 1944: VIII Corps, Third Army, 12th Army Group.
 8 August 1944: XV Corps.
24 August 1944: XV Corps, Third Army, 12th Army Group, but attached to First Army.
26 August 1944: XV Corps, First Army, 12th Army Group.
29 August 1944: XII Corps.
7 September 1944: XV Corps, Third Army, 12th Army Group.
29 September 1944: Third Army, 12th Army Group, but attached to the XV Corps, Seventh Army, 6th Army Group.
25 November 1944: XV Corps, Seventh Army, 6th Army Group.
5 December 1944: VI Corps.
 6 February 1945: Seventh Army, 6th Army Group.
 17 February 1945: Seventh Army, 6th Army Group, but attached to the XVI Corps, Ninth Army, 12th Army Group.
1 March 1945: XIII Corps.
7 March 1945: XVI Corps.
 7 April 1945: XVI Corps, Ninth Army, 12th Army Group.

79th Sustainment Support Command
The 79th Infantry Division is now the 79th Sustainment Support Command (SSC) headquartered at Joint Forces Training Base (JFTB) Los Alamitos, California. The 79th SSC was officially activated on 1 December 2009 with the mission of providing trained, ready, cohesive, well-led sustainment units for worldwide deployment to meet the U.S. Army's rotational and contingency mission requirements in support of the National Military Strategy. The 79th SSC is the higher headquarters of over 20,000 U.S. Army Reserve sustainment soldiers organized into over 200 units dispersed throughout the western half of the United States. Major subordinate commands of the 79th SSC include the 4th Sustainment Command (Expeditionary) in San Antonio, Texas, the 311th Sustainment Command (Expeditionary) in Los Angeles, California, the 364th Sustainment Command (Expeditionary) in Marysville, Washington, and the 451st Expeditionary Sustainment Command in Wichita, Kansas.  As the operational command posts of a theater sustainment command – the ESCs plan, coordinate synchronize, monitor, and control operational- level sustainment operations for Army service component commands, joint task forces and joint forces commands throughout the world.

Reactivated: 1 December 2009
Commanders
Major General William D. Frink, Jr. (1 December 2009 – 8 February 2013)
Major General Megan P. Tatu (9 February 2013 – 4 December 2015)
Major General Mark Palzer (5 December 2015 – 8 December 2018)
Major General Eugene J. Leboeuf (8 December 2018 – Present)

 Subordinate units 

As of 2020 the following units are subordinated to the 79th Theater Sustainment Command:

 79th Theater Sustainment Command, in Los Alamitos, California
 4th Sustainment Command (Expeditionary), at Fort Sam Houston, Texas
90th Sustainment Brigade, in Little Rock, Arkansas
 316th Support Battalion (Petrol), in Okmulgee, Oklahoma
 348th Transportation Battalion (TML), in Houston, Texas
300th Sustainment Brigade, in Grand Prairie, Texas
363d Support Battalion (PETRL PL & TML OP), in San Marcos, Texas211th Regional Support Group, in Corpus Christi, Texas
319th Combat Sustainment Support Battalion, in Harlingen, Texas
373d Combat Sustainment Support Battalion, in Beaumont, Texas647th Regional Support Group, in El Paso, Texas
372d Quartermaster Battalion (Petroleum Support) in Kirtland Air Force Base, Albuquerque, New Mexico
383d Support Battalion (PETRL PL & TML), in El Paso, Texas
 311th Sustainment Command (Expeditionary), in West Los Angeles, California
304th Sustainment Brigade, in Riverside, California
 155th Combat Sustainment Support Battalion, in South El Monte, California
 371st Combat Sustainment Support Battalion, in Riverside, California
 420th Support Battalion (MVT CTL) (EAC), in Sherman Oaks, California
 326th Finance Group, in West Los Angeles, California
 364th Sustainment Command (Expeditionary), in Marysville, Washington
 650th Regional Support Group, in North Las Vegas, Nevada
 314th Combat Sustainment Support Battalion, in Las Vegas, Nevada
 469th Combat Sustainment Support Battalion, in Mountain View, California
 483d Transportation Battalion, in Vallejo, California
 653rd Regional Support Group, in Mesa, Arizona
 336th Combat Sustainment Support Battalion, in Buckeye, Arizona
 418th Quartermaster Battalion (Petroleum Support) in Marana, Arizona
 419th Combat Sustainment Support Battalion, in Tustin, California
 451st Sustainment Command (Expeditionary), in Wichita, Kansas89th Sustainment Brigade, in Kansas City, Missouri
 329th Combat Sustainment Support Battalion, in Parsons, Kansas
 484th Transportation Battalion, in Springfield, Missouri
 620th Combat Sustainment Support Battalion, in St. Louis, Missouri
 561st Regional Support Group', in Elkhorn, Nebraska
 394th Combat Sustainment Support Battalion, in Fremont, Nebraska
 425th Transportation Battalion, in Salina, Kansas
 450th Transportation Battalion, in Manhattan, Kansas

General
Nickname: Cross of Lorraine Division.
Shoulder patch: White bordered blue shield on which is superimposed a cross of Lorraine.

In popular culture
 The HBO period drama Perry Mason depicts the titular character as a Captain who served in the 79th Infantry during World War I before receiving a blue discharge. The second episode depicts a flashback with Mason participating in the Meuse–Argonne offensive of 1918.

See also
 Rhino tank
 Royal C. Johnson, who served with the division during World War I
 Thomas W. Miller, who also served with the 79th Division in World War I
 Val A. Browning

Notes

References

6. The Cross of Lorraine: A Combat History of the 79th Infantry Division, June 1942-December 1945''. Army and Navy Publishing Co., 1946. [Official Division history]

Sources

External links

79th Inf, Small World War II Photo Album
Montfaucon: Captain Barber and the 313th Regiment  at American Battle Monuments Commission
The World War II Letters of Private Melvin W. Johnson of the 314th Infantry Regiment, 79th Division
World War I diary of Harry Frieman, 313th Machine Gun Company, 79th Division, Harry Frieman Collection (AFC/2001/001/23600), Veterans History Project, American Folklife Center, Library of Congress.

079th Infantry Division, U.S.
Military units and formations established in 1917
Infantry Division, U.S. 079
United States Army divisions of World War I